Hiṭia is the eleventh month of the Mandaean calendar. The first day of the month is Dehwa Daimana, the birthday of John the Baptist.

It is the Mandaic name for the constellation Sagittarius. It currently corresponds to May / Jun in the Gregorian calendar due to a lack of a leap year in the Mandaean calendar.

References

Months of the Mandaean calendar
Sagittarius in astrology